The Seventh-day Adventist Church is a major Christian denomination with a significant presence in Nigeria with over 249,207 members as of 30 June 2018. The Seventh-day Adventist Church splits Nigeria into three unions.

Sub Fields
Eastern Nigerian Union Conference 
Aba East Conference 
Aba North Conference 
Aba South Conference 
Abia North-Central Conference 
Akwa Ibom Conference 
Anambra Mission 
Bayelsa Mission 
Cross River Conference 
Ebonyi Conference 
Enugu Conference 
Imo Conference 
Port Harcourt Conference 
Rivers East Conference
Rivers West Conference
Northern Nigerian Union Conference 
North Central Nigeria Conference 
North East Nigeria Conference
North West Nigeria Conference 
Western Nigeria Union Conference 
Delta Conference 
Edo Conference 
Ekiti Conference 
Kogi Region 
Kwara Conference 
Lagos Atlantic Conference 
Lagos Mainland Conference 
Ogun Conference 
Ondo Mission 
Osun Conference 
Oyo Conference

Education facilities
There are 8 secondary schools operated by the Seventh-day Adventist Church in Nigeria. There are also two schools of higher learning named Babcock University, Adeleke University & Clifford University.

Medical facilities
The Seventh-day Adventist Church operates five hospitals and 17 clinics in Nigeria named Babcock University Teaching Hospital (BUTH) Ogun state, ilisan remo; Inisa Community Medical Centre; Jengre Seventh-day Adventist Hospital; Seventh-day Adventist Hospital and Motherless Babies' Home, ABA; Seventh-day Adventist Hospital Ile-Ife; Aiyetoro Ekiti Medical Centre; Gbongan Adventist Health Centre; Ilishan-Remo Adventist Health Centre; Ramin Kura Health Centre; Ubakala Adventist Health Centre; Maigamo Dispensary; Edeoha Community Rehabilitation Center; Jengre Veterinary Clinic; Seventh-day Adventist Veterinary Clinic; Arum Tumara Clinic; Gurum Clinic; Kayarda Clinic; Kurgwi Clinic; Massenge Clinic; Salingo Clinic; Tirwum Clinic & Tshohon Yadi Clinic.

History

Suing government
In 2018 three Seventh-day Adventists sued the Federal Government, the Attorney General of the Federation and the Independent National Electoral Commission, in court for violation of their religion. They are asking the court to force the Independent National Electoral Commission to stop having elections on Saturday. They are also asking the court that they be awarded fifty million naira for the breach of their religion.

See also
Christianity in Nigeria
Australian Union Conference of Seventh-day Adventists
Seventh-day Adventist Church in Brazil 
Seventh-day Adventist Church in Canada 
Seventh-day Adventist Church in the People's Republic of China
Seventh-day Adventist Church in Colombia 
Seventh-day Adventist Church in Cuba
Seventh-day Adventist Church in India 
Italian Union of Seventh-day Adventist Churches
Seventh-day Adventist Church in Ghana 
New Zealand Pacific Union Conference of Seventh-day Adventists
Adventism in Norway
Romanian Union Conference of Seventh-day Adventists
Seventh-day Adventist Church in Sweden 
Seventh-day Adventist Church in Thailand
Seventh-day Adventist Church in Tonga 
Seventh-day Adventists in Turks and Caicos Islands

References 

Christian denominations in Nigeria
Churches in Nigeria
History of the Seventh-day Adventist Church
Nigeria
Nigeria